The State University of Ponta Grossa (UEPG) is a public higher education institution in the state of Paraná, Brazil. The university has two campuses in the city of Ponta Grossa and one campus in the city of Telêmaco Borba. UEPG influences approximately 22 municipalities of Paraná.

The institution offers 36 undergraduate degree programs, in addition to graduate degree programs. The university also offers distance education.

History

UEPG was created by the State Government through the Law 6.034, November 6, 1969, and Decree no 18.111, January 28, 1970, which resulted in the incorporation of the already existing faculties that were working independently, such as the State College of Philosophy, Sciences and Letters of Ponta Grossa, the State College of Pharmacy and Dentistry of Ponta Grossa, the State College of Law of Ponta Grossa and the State College of Economic Sciences and Administration of Ponta Grossa.

Campus
UEPG currently has three campuses, two located in the city of Ponta Grossa and one located in the city of Telêmaco Borba, both in the state of Paraná. The university's main campus is located in downtown Ponta Grossa, and the administrative building is located in the Uvaranas area.

The Uvaranas campus has, among other facilities, a running track, a soccer field, multisport courts, a heated pool, an astronomical observatory and a library, the Central Library Professor Faris Michaele, with over 90.000 copies.

Academics

Divisions 
Agrarian and Technological Sciences

Civil Engineering
 Agronomy
 Software Engineering
 Materials Engineering
 Food Engineering
 Computer Engineering
 Zootechnics

Life Sciences

 Biology
 Physical Education
 Nursing
 Pharmacy
 Medicine
 Dentistry

Humanities and Arts

 Visual Arts
 History
 Education
 Languages and Literature (Portuguese/English, Portuguese/Spanish and Portuguese/French)
 Music

Exact Sciences

 Mathematics
 Physics
 Geography
 Chemistry
 Chemical Technology

Social Sciences

 Administration
 Economics
 International Trade
 Social Service
 Accounting
 Journalism
 Tourism

Law

Healthcare 
UEPG administers the Regional University Hospital of Campos Gerais, which attends to patients from 12 cities of Parana. The hospital has 168 beds: 6 in the Neonatal Intensive Care Unit (ICU); 4 in the Pediatric ICU; 20 in the Adult ICU; 2 in the Neonatal ICU; 32 in Internal Medicine; 63 in Surgery and 41 in Nursery.

Rankings 

In 2017, Times Higher Education ranked the university within the 801-1000 band globally.

Admissions 
The admission process for prospective students happens through an entrance exam called vestibular or through the Serial Selective Process (PSS), a three-stage process composed of tests similar to the vestibular. Each stage happens in one of the three years that constitute the Brazilian High School system.

The vestibular can be taken by anyone that wishes to study at the university, but the PSS can only be taken by high school students.

Economic impact 
According to studies, every real invested in the higher education institutions is multiplied by four when returned to local economies. Thus, UEPG has an annual impact of 500 million reais (about U$120 mi) on the regional economy.

References

External links
 Official UEPG Website 
 Government of the State of Parana 
International Relations Office (in Portuguese)
Information Sheet 

Educational institutions established in 1969
Universities and colleges in Paraná
Ponta Grossa
Education in Telêmaco Borba
1969 establishments in Brazil
Ponta Grossa